Daniel Muñoz-de la Nava was the defending champion, but lost in the second round.
Paolo Lorenzi won the title, defeating Daniel Gimeno-Traver 7–6(7–5), 6–3 in the final.

Seeds

Draw

Finals

Top half

Bottom half

References
 Main Draw
 Qualifying Draw

Zucchetti Kos Tennis Cup - Singles
2012 Singles
Zucchetti